Karen Marie Moning is an American author. Many of her novels have appeared on the New York Times Bestseller List with Shadowfever reaching the number one position on multiple national best sellers lists. She is a winner of the prestigious Romance Writers of America RITA award for Best Paranormal Romance and is a multiple RITA nominee.

Biography
Karen Marie Moning was born in Cincinnati, Ohio, the daughter of Anthony R. Moning and Janet L. Moning. Moning graduated from Purdue University with a Bachelor's degree in Society and Law. Before becoming a full-time writer, she worked as a bartender, a computer consultant, and an insurance specialist.

Moning began her career writing paranormal romance set in Scotland. Beyond the Highland Mist was published in 1999 and nominated for two RITA awards. She then published six more novels in her award-winning HIGHLANDER series, and received the RITA Award in 2001 for The Highlander’s Touch.

But as she became increasingly fascinated with Celtic mythology, she switched genres to Urban Fantasy and location to Dublin, Ireland, so she could focus on the  Tuatha Dé Danann, or Fae—an ancient race of immortal beings who have lived secretly among humans for millennia.

Bibliography

Highlander Series
Beyond the Highland Mist (1999/Mar) 
To Tame a Highland Warrior (1999/Dec) 
The Highlander's Touch (2000/Nov) 
Kiss of the Highlander (2001/Sep) 
The Dark Highlander (2002/Oct) 
The Immortal Highlander (2004/Aug) 
Spell of the Highlander (2005/Aug) 
Into The Dreaming (2006/Aug)

Fever Series
Darkfever (2006/Oct) 
Bloodfever (2007/Oct) 
Faefever (2008/Sep) 
Dreamfever (2009/Aug) 
Shadowfever (2011/Jan) 
Iced (2012/Oct) 
Burned (2015/Jan) 
Feverborn (2016/Jan) 
Feversong (2017/Jan) 
High Voltage (2018/Mar) 
Kingdom of Shadow and Light (2021/Feb)

Fever Moon
Fever Moon is an original story from Karen Marie Moning, which has been adapted into a graphic novel by David Lawrence and illustrated by Al Rio. In this installment of the series, Mac and Barrons work together to defeat the Fear Dorcha. When it becomes clear that this epic evil is hunting Mac, slowly killing those closest to her, Mac’s only weapons are her lover, Barrons and the Spear of Destiny.

References or sources

External links

Facebook Page
Official blog

Living people
American women novelists
Writers from Cincinnati
Novelists from Georgia (U.S. state)
Novelists from Florida
American romantic fiction writers
Purdue University alumni
RITA Award winners
20th-century American women writers
21st-century American women writers
20th-century American novelists
21st-century American novelists
1964 births
Women romantic fiction writers
Novelists from Ohio
Dark fantasy writers
Urban fantasy writers